Erick Lopez Rios (born 29 December 1972) is a Cuban male artistic gymnast, representing his nation at international competitions.  He participated at the 2000 Summer Olympics and 2004 Summer Olympics as well as the Pan American Games. He also competed at world championship level.

References

1972 births
Living people
Cuban male artistic gymnasts
Place of birth missing (living people)
Gymnasts at the 2000 Summer Olympics
Gymnasts at the 2004 Summer Olympics
Gymnasts at the 1991 Pan American Games
Gymnasts at the 1995 Pan American Games
Gymnasts at the 1999 Pan American Games
Olympic gymnasts of Cuba
Pan American Games medalists in gymnastics
Pan American Games gold medalists for Cuba
Pan American Games silver medalists for Cuba
Pan American Games bronze medalists for Cuba
Medalists at the 1991 Pan American Games
Medalists at the 1995 Pan American Games
Medalists at the 1999 Pan American Games
Medalists at the 2003 Pan American Games
20th-century Cuban people
21st-century Cuban people